Comovirus is a genus of viruses in the order Picornavirales, in the family Secoviridae, in the subfamily Comovirinae. Plants serve as natural hosts. There are 15 species in this genus.

Taxonomy
The genus contains the following species:
Andean potato mottle virus
Bean pod mottle virus
Bean rugose mosaic virus
Broad bean stain virus
Broad bean true mosaic virus
Cowpea mosaic virus
Cowpea severe mosaic virus
Glycine mosaic virus
Pea green mottle virus
Pea mild mosaic virus
Quail pea mosaic virus
Radish mosaic virus
Red clover mottle virus
Squash mosaic virus
Ullucus virus C

Structure
Viruses in Comovirus are non-enveloped, with icosahedral geometries, and T=pseudo3 symmetry. The diameter is around 28-30 nm. Genomes are linear and segmented, bipartite, around 24-7kb in length.

Life cycle
Viral replication is cytoplasmic. Entry into the host cell is achieved by penetration into the host cell. Replication follows the positive stranded RNA virus replication model. Positive stranded rna virus transcription is the method of transcription. The virus exits the host cell by tubule-guided viral movement.
Plants serve as the natural host. The virus is transmitted via a vector (beetle). Transmission routes are vector and mechanical.

References

External links
 Viralzone: Comovirus
 ICTV

Comoviruses
Virus genera